Africa Express is a 1975 Italian adventure film starring Ursula Andress, Giuliano Gemma, and Jack Palance that was filmed in Rhodesia. A sequel Safari Express with the same leads followed a year later.

Plot 
John Baxter is a freewheeling trader of goods in Africa with a pet chimpanzee and one dream: to save enough money to buy a gas station in Detroit. Madeleine Cooper is the lady of mystery he runs into as she flees from Hunter

Cast 
 Giuliano Gemma as John Baxter 
 Ursula Andress as Madeleine Cooper 
 Jack Palance as William Hunter 
  as Father Gasparetto 
 Luciana Turina as Lily 
 Rossana Di Lorenzo as Mitzy 
 Nello Pazzafini as Hunter's Henchman
 John Wener as Louis Renois
 Romano Puppo
 Sergio Smacchi
 Alberto Dell'Acqua
 Werner Doll
 Biba the chimpanzee

Reception
Italian film critic Marco Giusti calls the film a "cute little movie" (Italian: "filmetto carino"), the best being Ursula Andress dressed as dirty sister.

Bibliography

External links 
 
 

1975 films
1970s action adventure films
1970s Italian-language films
Films directed by Michele Lupo
Films scored by Guido & Maurizio De Angelis
Italian action adventure films
Films with screenplays by Mario Amendola
1970s Italian films